A tomahawk is a type of axe made and used by Native Americans.

Tomahawk may also refer to:

Places

Australia
 Tomahawk, Tasmania, a town

Canada
 Tomahawk, Alberta, a hamlet

New Zealand
 Ocean Grove, New Zealand, formerly called Tomahawk from the Māori toma haka, now a suburb of the city of Dunedin
 Tomahawk Beach, the beach below Ocean Grove
 Tomahawk Lagoon, a coastal lake adjacent to Ocean Grove

United States
 Tomahawk Township, Searcy County, Arkansas, a township
 Tomahawk, Kentucky, a small community in eastern Kentucky
 Tomahawk, West Virginia, an unincorporated community
 Tomahawk, Wisconsin, a city
 Tomahawk (town), Wisconsin, a town adjacent to the city of the same name
 Tomahawk School District, a school district in Wisconsin
 Lake Tomahawk, Wisconsin, a town
 Lake Tomahawk (community), Wisconsin, an unincorporated community
 Tomahawk River, a river in Wisconsin

People
 Tom Hawkins (footballer, born 1988), an Australian rules footballer, nicknamed "Tomahawk"
 Tomahawk T.T., Takuya Onodera, a Japanese professional wrestler

Arts, entertainment, and media

Fictional entities
 Tomahawk (comics), a DC Comics character, published in his own series from the 1940s to 1970s
 Tomahawk (G.I. Joe), a helicopter in the G.I. Joe universe
 Tomahawk (Transformers), a Transformers character

Music 
 Tomahawk (band), an alternative/experimental band fronted by Mike Patton
 Tomahawk (album), an album by Tomahawk
 Tomahawk Technique, an album by Sean Paul
 "Tomahawk", a single by BT and Adam K

Other arts, entertainment, and media
 Tomahawk (film) (1951), directed by George Sherman
 Tomahawk (satirical magazine), a weekly magazine (1867–1870)

Military 
 Tomahawk (missile), a cruise missile built in the United States
Curtiss P-40 Warhawk, early variants were named Tomahawk in RAF service
 Nike-Tomahawk, a U.S. sounding rocket
 Operation Tomahawk, an airborne military operation
 Taurus Tomahawk, a two-stage elevator sounding rocket
 TE-416 Tomahawk, a U.S. sounding rocket
 USS Tomahawk (AO-88), a World War II fuel supply ship

Transportation 
 Tomahawk (train), a train operated by the Chicago, Milwaukee, St. Paul and Pacific Railroad (the "Milwaukee Road")
 Tomahawk, a children's bicycle similar to the Raleigh Chopper
 Dodge Tomahawk, a concept motorcycle
 ITV Tomahawk, a French paraglider design
 Piper PA-38 Tomahawk, a light general aviation aircraft
 SRT Tomahawk Gran Turismo, a concept car created by SRT for the Gran Turismo series
 Tomahawk Railway, a U.S. railroad

Sports

Moves or plays
 In basketball, a one-handed slam dunk, where the ball is brought over the head before being stuffed into the basket, in a chopping motion
 In beach volleyball, an overhead method of contacting the ball
 In field hockey, a type of hit where the hockey stick is turned so that the rounded side faces the ground and then swung in such a way that it hits the ball in a downward chopping motion
 In football/soccer, a name given to Cristiano Ronaldo's direct free kicks
 A turning maneuver used in roller skating
 Tomahawk chop, a controversial celebratory gesture made by fans of multiple American sports teams

Teams
 Johnstown Tomahawks, a Tier II Junior A ice hockey team from Johnstown, Pennsylvania
 Mississauga Tomahawks Jr. A, a Junior "A" box lacrosse team from Mississauga, Ontario
 Tomahawks, the nickname for the United States national rugby league team
 Toronto Tomahawks, a former team in the National Lacrosse League
 Williamsport Tomahawks, a former Class AA Eastern League baseball team in Williamsport, Pennsylvania

Other uses
 Tomahawk (geometry), a mathematical tool that can be used to trisect angles
 Tomahawk (software), a cross-platform music player for Windows, Mac and Linux, see List of Linux audio software
 Tomahawk, a set of Java Server Faces components created by the MyFaces development team prior to its donation to Apache
 A tomahawk steak is a rib steak with the bone attached
Tomahawk, a series of switching chips at Broadcom Corporation

See also 
 Tokamak, a magnetic confinement device, used in nuclear fusion experiments